Samachar Chandrika was a weekly newspaper founded in 1822 by Bhabani Charan Bandyopadhyay it was an orthodox Hindu newspaper of the Dharma Sabha. It campaigned against social reforms including  the ban on Sati by Lord William Bentinck. It was published for over 32 years.

References

Publications established in 1822
Newspapers published in India
Bengali-language newspapers published in India
Defunct newspapers published in India